Coulsontown Cottages Historic District is a national historic district located at Coulsontown in Peach Bottom Township in York County, Pennsylvania. The district includes four contributing buildings.  They are stone cottages built between 1845 and 1865.  They are two story dwellings, 2/3 by 1 bay, with slate covered gable roofs and end chimneys.  There are two rooms downstairs and two rooms upstairs.

It was listed on the National Register of Historic Places in 1985.

References 

Houses on the National Register of Historic Places in Pennsylvania
Historic districts on the National Register of Historic Places in Pennsylvania
Houses in York County, Pennsylvania
National Register of Historic Places in York County, Pennsylvania